Session man may refer to:
 Session musician, one who works with others at live performances or recording sessions
 Session Man (film), a 1991 short drama film that won an Academy Award in 1992
 Jimmy Page: Session Man, a two-volume compilation album featuring Jimmy Page as a session musician
 "Session Man", a song by The Kinks on their album Face to Face